Richard Jones (born 26 April 1969 in Usk) is a Welsh former footballer who made nearly 200 appearances in the Football League playing as a midfielder for Newport County, Hereford United and Swansea City. He then spent six seasons with Barry Town, including one season as player-manager, and also played for Merthyr Tydfil and Haverfordwest County.

References

1969 births
Living people
People from Usk
Sportspeople from Monmouthshire
Welsh footballers
Association football midfielders
Newport County A.F.C. players
Hereford United F.C. players
Swansea City A.F.C. players
Barry Town United F.C. players
Merthyr Tydfil F.C. players
English Football League players
Cymru Premier players
Welsh football managers
Barry Town United F.C. managers
Cymru Premier managers
Haverfordwest County A.F.C. players